Tufutafoe is a village on the island of Savai'i in Samoa. It is situated on the west coast of the island in Vaisigano district. The village population is 434.

References

Populated places in Vaisigano